The gray-bellied tree mouse (Pogonomys sylvestris) is a species of rodent in the family Muridae.
It is found only in Papua New Guinea.

It is consumed by the Kalam people of Papua New Guinea, and is hunted by women who look for it in its burrows.

References

Pogonomys
Rodents of Papua New Guinea
Mammals described in 1920
Taxonomy articles created by Polbot
Taxa named by Oldfield Thomas